Jani Tuohimaa, professionally known as Voli, is a Finnish rapper. His first release was a 2004 album Hoodipihvii with a fellow rapper Heikki Kuula. In 2006 they teamed up again for an album Wordcup. Voli is also a member of the hip hop and rap group Teflon Brothers, along with Heikki Kuula and Pyhimys. The band has released three albums so far; T (2009), © (2010) and Valkoisten dyynien ratsastajat (2013).

Selected discography

Heikki Kuula & Voli

Teflon Brothers

References

Living people
Finnish rappers
Finnish hip hop musicians
Year of birth missing (living people)